The Guandi Dam is a gravity dam on the Yalong River, a tributary of the Yangtze River in Sichuan Province Southwest of China. It supplies water to four hydroelectric generators, each with generating capacity of 600 MW. The total generating capacity of the project is 2,400 MW. Construction started on October 20, 2010, with a ground-breaking ceremony. On February 9, 2012, the dam began to impound the reservoir and the last of the four generators were commissioned on 28 March 2013.

See also 

 List of power stations in China

References 

Hydroelectric power stations in Sichuan
Dams in China
Dams completed in 2012
Dams on the Yalong River
Gravity dams
Roller-compacted concrete dams